Lance Williams may refer to:

 Lance Williams (graphics researcher) (1949–2017), creator of mipmapping
 Lance Williams, San Francisco Chronicle reporter and author of the book Game of Shadows, see Lance Williams and Mark Fainaru-Wada
 Lance Williams (basketball) (born 1980), American basketball player
 Lance Williams (Rugby union), American Rugby union player